Hoke County Courthouse is a historic courthouse building located at Raeford, Hoke County, North Carolina. It was designed by the architectural firm of Milburn, Heister & Company and built in 1912.  It is a three-story Classical Revival style tan brick building fronted by a tetrastyle pedimented Ionic order portico.

It was listed on the National Register of Historic Places in 1979.

References

County courthouses in North Carolina
Courthouses on the National Register of Historic Places in North Carolina
Neoclassical architecture in North Carolina
Government buildings completed in 1912
Buildings and structures in Hoke County, North Carolina
National Register of Historic Places in Hoke County, North Carolina
1912 establishments in North Carolina